The 1912 Ole Miss Rebels football team represented the University of Mississippi during the 1912 college football season.

Schedule

Players

Line

Backfield

References

Ole Miss
Ole Miss Rebels football seasons
Ole Miss Rebels football